Organized Crime is a board game published by Koplow Games in 1974.

Gameplay
Organized Crime is an economic political strategy game about the mafia.

Reviews
Games & Puzzles
Jeux & Stratégie

References

External links
 

Board games introduced in 1974